Kankalini Temple (Nepali language:कंकालिनी मन्दिर) is a temple and Shakti Peethas in Eastern Nepal in Bhardaha VDC, Saptari, 19 km east of district headquarter Rajbiraj and near the Indian border at Birpur. It draws Nepali and Indian pilgrims, especially during Dashain when thousands of goats are sacrificed there. The temple is near Mahendra Highway Bhardah section.

History
According to History and Hindu Legend during establishment of human village in Bhardaha, they found a stone statue of Durga while digging land there. At that time they settled the statue in Kankalini temple and start worshiping. It is believed that devotee wish come true when they pray goddess with great devotion.

Transport

Road Transport
The Temple is on Mahendra Highway and easily accessible via road. it is at around 17 Km distance from nearest city Rajbiraj.

Air Transport
Rajbiraj Airport is the nearest airport roughly 20 KM away is located in District headquarter and nearest city Rajbiraj. Shree Airlines operates daily flights between Rajbiraj and Kathmandu

References

External links

See also

Hindu temples in Madhesh Province
Shakti Peethas
Buildings and structures in Saptari District
Durga temples